Giannis Goumas is a Greek professional football manager and former player, who spent his whole senior career at Panathinaikos.

Club career
Born on 24 May 1975 in the village of Ampelonas, near Larisa, Goumas is one of the many players to emerge from Panathinaikos F.C.'s youth academy and served the club for 15 years, debuting for the first team in 1994. Playing as a central defender, Goumas was known for his tough tackling, excellent aerial ability and his unusual ability of scoring goals, often with spectacular shots. Goumas has also scored some very important and impressive goals during his career against Real Madrid, Juventus and Glasgow Rangers in European competitions and the title-deciding goal against rivals Olympiakos, in 2004.

The 34-year-old parted company with Panathinaikos in late June 2009 by mutual consent, ending his career with the Greens after 277 league appearances, and 27 goals. In September, Goumas announced his retirement from professional football.

International career
Goumas was a regular member of the Greece national team since making his debut in February 1999 against Finland. He was part of the Greece squad that won the UEFA Euro 2004.

Managerial career
On 30 May 2012, he was announced as the head coach of Glyfada, replacing Murat Seropian.

On 3 December 2014, Goumas took officially the technical leadership of the Greece U19 as announced by the EPO. The historical defeat of our team to 10-0 from Switzerland U19 was the end of Vasilis Tzalokostas from the technical leadership. The veteran ace of Panathinaikos will be responsible for both U18 and U19 national teams. Prior to that Goumas has worked in Skoda Xanthi.

Career statistics

Managerial statistics

Honours
Panathinaikos
 Super League: 1995, 1996, 2004
 Greek Cup: 1995, 2004; runner-up: 1997–98, 1998–99, 2006–07

Greece
 European Championship: 2004

See also
 List of one-club men in association football

References

1975 births
Living people
Greek footballers
Greece international footballers
Greece under-21 international footballers
UEFA Euro 2004 players
UEFA European Championship-winning players
2005 FIFA Confederations Cup players
UEFA Euro 2008 players
Panathinaikos F.C. players
Super League Greece players
Association football central defenders
People from Larissa (regional unit)
Greek football managers
A.O. Glyfada F.C. managers
Footballers from Thessaly